Ron Roberts (born October 9, 1967) is an American football coach who currently serves as defensive coordinator at Auburn University.

Coaching career

Assistant coaching career
Roberts started his coaching career as the defensive coordinator at Houston High School in 1990. From Houston, Roberts served as head coach at Burroughs High School from 1994 to 1996 before taking his first college job at Greensboro in 1997. From Greensboro he served as defensive coordinator at both Tusculum (1998–2002) and Texas State (2003) before returning to the head coaching ranks at Mt. Whitney High School in 2004. In January 2005 Roberts resigned his position at Mt. Whitney to serve as defensive coordinator at Delta State University After the 2017 season at Southeastern, Coach Roberts accepted a defensive coordinator job with the Louisiana Ragin' Cajuns, his first coaching job at a Division I FBS level. Coach Roberts is the former defensive coordinator at Baylor University, where he led the #1 Scoring Defense in the Big 12 in 2021. At the conclusion of the 2022 season, Baylor head coach Dave Aranda announced that Roberts had been relieved of his duties. Less than 2 weeks later, new Auburn head coach Hugh Freeze named Roberts the program's defensive coordinator.

Head coaching career
After the resignation of Rick Rhoades on January 12, 2007, Roberts was promoted from his position of defensive coordinator to head coach. Through the 2011 season, Delta State has won four Gulf South Conference championships and played in the Division II playoffs in four of his five years as head coach reaching the 2010 NCAA Division II Championship Game where they lost to Minnesota–Duluth 20–17.

After a successful tenure at Delta State, Roberts became Southeastern Louisiana University's fifteenth head coach on December 19, 2011. He finished his first season with the Lions with an overall record of five wins and six losses (5–6). On November 7, 2013, Roberts signed a three-year contract extension with the Lions. With their victory over Sam Houston State on November 16, 2013, Southeastern Louisiana captured their first Southland Conference championship in program history.

Head coaching record

College

References

External links
 Southeastern Louisiana profile

1967 births
Living people
American football linebackers
Auburn Tigers football coaches
College of the Sequoias Giants football players
Delta State Statesmen football coaches
Greensboro Pride football coaches
Southeastern Louisiana Lions football coaches
UT Martin Skyhawks football players
Texas State Bobcats football coaches
Tusculum Pioneers football coaches
High school football coaches in California
High school football coaches in Tennessee
Sportspeople from Visalia, California
Players of American football from California